The Diary of Sisyphus is an upcoming Italian independent experimental drama film. It is the first feature length film to be written by an artificial intelligence.

Synopsis 
For the first time as a screenwriter, an AI narrates the life of Adam, a young college student plagued by existential crisis, and his journey toward the meaning of life, amid absurd encounters and very human vibes.

Production 
The script was written by GPT-NEO, an open-source version of GPT-3 by EleutherAI. The model was prompted with a synopsis, the plot lines, and desired scenes. The entire script, with the exception of the opening monologue, was written by GPT-NEO.

The cast includes Niccolò Babbo, Stefano Pellizzari, Chiara Signorini Gremigni, Lorenzo Maria Angelin, Diletta Feruglio, Massimo Somaglino, Marco Risiglione, Fabiano Fantini, Paolo Mattotti, Nicole Greatti, Pietro Cursano, Mattia Giacchetto and Guglielmo Favilla.

References

External links 
 

Italian independent films
2020s Italian-language films
2023 films
2020s Italian films
Upcoming films